John Wesley Edward Bowen (December 3, 1855 – July 20, 1933) was born into American slavery and became a Methodist clergyman, denominational official, college and university educator and one of the first African Americans to earn a Ph.D. degree in the United States. He is credited as the first African American to receive the Ph.D. degree from Boston University, which was granted in 1887.

Biography

Early life
Bowen was born in New Orleans, Louisiana, on December 3, 1855, the son of Edward Bowen and Rose Simon Bowen. Edward Bowen, a carpenter, was originally from Maryland and later lived in Washington, D.C., but moved to New Orleans, where he was enslaved and held in bondage until he purchased his own freedom. In 1858, he purchased freedom for his wife and son, then three years old. Edward Bowen later served in the Union Army during the Civil War. Rose Simon Bowen was the granddaughter of an African princess of the Jolloffer tribe on the west coast of Africa.

Education

After the Civil War, J. W. E. Bowen studied at the Union Normal School in New Orleans, and New Orleans University, a university established by the Methodist Episcopal Church for the education of freedmen. (New Orleans University merged with Straight College in 1934 to form Dillard University) Bowen received a Bachelor of Arts degree with the university's first graduating class in 1878. From 1878 to 1882, he taught mathematics, Latin and Greek at Central Tennessee College (later known as Walden University (Tennessee)) in Nashville.

In 1882, Bowen began theological studies at Boston University. While a theological student, he was the pastor of Revere Street Methodist Episcopal Church in Boston, Massachusetts. In 1884, he completed work on, and was awarded, a Master of Arts (M.A.) degree from New Orleans University. When he completed the requirements for the Bachelor of Sacred Theology (S.T.B.) degree from Boston University in 1885, his classmates selected him as one of two students to speak at commencement exercises.

After graduation, Bowen became pastor of St. John's Methodist Episcopal Church in Newark, New Jersey. He received a Master of Arts degree from New Orleans University in 1886. He married Ariel Serena Hedges of Baltimore, Maryland in 1886. They became the parents of four children.

In that same year, Bowen entered the Ph.D. program at Boston University in historical theology. He also did special advanced work in Greek, Latin, Hebrew, Chaldee, Arabic, and German, and in metaphysics and psychology. Boston University conferred the Ph.D. degree upon him in 1887. Later, Gammon Theological Seminary made him its first recipient of the honorary degree of doctor of divinity.

Baltimore and Washington D.C. years
Bowen was chiefly a pastor after completing his doctoral degree. He pastored the Centennial Methodist Episcopal Church in Baltimore and also served as a professor of church history and systematic theology at Morgan College. A gifted preacher, Bowen conducted a notable revival during this pastorate in which there were 735 conversions. Bowen also served as pastor of Asbury Methodist Episcopal Church in Washington, D.C. and as a professor of Hebrew at Howard University.

From 1889 to 1893, Bowen was a member and examiner for the American Institute of Sacred Literature. In 1892, he published "What Shall the Harvest Be? A National Sermon; or A Series of Plain Talks to the Colored People of America, on Their Problems." He represented the Methodist Episcopal church at the Conferences of World Methodism in Washington D.C. in 1891 and London in 1901.

Years at Gammon Theological Seminary
In 1893, Bowen became professor of historical theology at Gammon Theological Seminary in Atlanta, Georgia, a seminary founded in 1883 by the Methodist Episcopal Church for the preparation of African-American clergymen. He was the first African-American to teach there full-time. As the secretary of Gammon's Stewart Missionary Foundation for Africa, he also edited its periodical, the Stewart Missionary Magazine.

In October, 1895, Bowen delivered "An Appeal to the King" on "Negro Day" at the Atlanta Cotton States' Exposition. That December, he organized an important three-day conference on Africa held in conjunction with the exposition and published its proceedings as "Africa and the American Negro...Addresses and Proceedings of the Congress on Africa Held Under the Auspices of the Stewart Missionary Foundation for Africa of Gammon Theological Seminary in Connection with the Cotton States and International Exposition December 13–15, 1895" (1896).

As a member of the Board of Control of the Methodist Episcopal Church's Epworth League, he organized a national conference in Atlanta on the Christian education of African-American youth. With Irvine Garland Penn, Bowen also edited and published its proceedings, "The United Negro:…Addresses and Proceedings, The Negro Young People's Christian and Educational Congress," held on August 6–11, 1902 (1902).

In January 1904, Bowen and Jesse Max Barber launched The Voice of the Negro, a Literary journal addressed to a national audience of African Americans. In September, 1905, they endorsed the Niagara Movement. Months later, they promoted the organization of the Georgia Equal Rights League, which had similar objectives. At the peak of its circulation in 1906, The Voice of the Negro claimed 12,000 to 15,000 subscribers.

In 1906, Bowen became the President of Gammon. In September, however, his inaugural year was shadowed by a severe race riot in which white rioters brutally attacked black people in Atlanta. Bowen opened the seminary to shelter black refugees from the riot. Three days after the rioting began, he was beaten and arrested by Atlanta's white police. Barber fled the city, taking The Voice of the Negro with him to Chicago, where he continued its publication for a year without Bowen's assistance. Bowen survived the Atlanta race riot and served as Gammon's President until 1910.

Bowen retired as head of the church history department of Gammon in 1926 but continued to teach until 1932, when he became an emeritus professor.

Bowen and his first wife, Ariel Serena Hedges Bowen, were the parents of four children. One of the children, John W.E. Bowen Jr., graduated from Phillips Exeter Academy, Wesleyan University and Harvard University. He became, like his father, a prominent figure in the Methodist Episcopal church, and was elected a bishop in 1949.  Bowen's first wife died in 1904 while visiting the World's Fair in St. Louis, Missouri. In 1906 he married Irene L. Smallwood, who survived him. Bowen died on July 20, 1933, the last of his New Orleans University graduating class and the school's oldest alumnus.

References

Further reading
 The John Wesley Edward Bowen collection at the Gammon Theological Seminary Archives housed in The Atlanta University Center Woodruff Library, Archives and Special Collections Department (185), Reel 23.
 John Wesley Edward Bowen, letter to George B. Johnson, November 30, 1909, p. 2. In the Gammon Theological Seminary Archives; The Atlanta University Center Woodruff Library, Archives and Special Collections Department, #7970, UM313, Reel 11.
 Union Seminary Quarterly Review, Vol. 47, Nos. 3-4, pp. 101–136, 1993, article by James Washington, Ph.D.
 John Robert Van Pelt, “John Wesley Edward Bowen”, Journal of Negro History , Volume 19 (April 1934), p. 217-21
 Bowen, John Wesley Edward Microsoft Encarta Africana Third Edition. © 1998–2000 Microsoft Corporation  Contributed By Richard Bardolph.
 An extensive interview with J. W. E. Bowen Jr. on May 26, 1957, in Greensboro, North Carolina.
 Who's Who in America (1926).
 Dictionary of American Negro Biography by Rayford W. Logan and Michael R. Winston, editors. Copyright 1982 by Rayford W. Logan and Michael R. Winston (New York: W.W. Norton, 1982)
 Biography from American National Biography (2004) Published under the auspices of the American Council of Learned Societies and Oxford University Press, 2004, Oxford University Press
 Rufus Barrow The Personalism of John Wesley Edward Bowen, Journal of Negro History, Volume 82, No. 2 (Spring 1997) p. 244-56
 The Booker T. Washington Papers, ed. Louis R. Harlan, et al. (1972–1989)
 Unpublished documents in the Booker T. Washington papers at the Library of Congress 
 Alphonso A. McPheeters, “The Origin and Development of Clark University and Gammon Theological Seminary” (Ed.D diss, University of Cincinnati, 1944)
 Prince Albert Taylor Jr., “A History of Gammon Theological Seminary” (Ph.D diss, New York University, 1948)
 August Meier, Negro Thought in America 1880–1915
 Radical Ideologies the Age of Booker T. Washington (1963)
 Harlan, “Booker T. Washington and the Voice of the Negro, 1904–1907”, Journal of Southern History, 45 (February 1979)
 Alfred A. Moss Jr., The American Negro Academy: Voice of the Talented Tenth (1981)
 Ralph E. Lucker, The Social Gospel in Black and White: American Racial Reform, 1885–1912 (1991)
 Obituary, Atlanta Constitution, July 21, 1933
 Library of Southern Literature, Volume 15, Biographical Dictionary of Authors [now Biographical Dictionary of Southern Authors. Compiled by Lucian Lamar Knight, Atlanta: Martin & Hoyt, Co. (1929)]
 A Dictionary of American Authors. Fifth Edition, revised and enlarged. 'Oscar Fay Adams, New York: Houghton Mifflin Co., 1904.
 National Cyclopedia of American Biography, volume 14, New York; James T. White & co. 1910.
 Who's Who of the Colored Race. Volume One. Edited by Frank Lincoln Mather. Detroit: Gale Research Co. (1915)
 A Cumulative Index to Biographical Material in Books and Magazines, Volume 24, September, 1998 – August, 1999. New York: H.W. Wilson co. (1999)
 Mary Mace Spradling (ed.), In Black and White. A Guide to Magazine Articles, Newspaper Articles, and Books Concerning Black Individuals and Groups. Third edition. Detroit: Gale Research (1985)
 Seventy Years of Service...New Orleans University. Faculty of New Orleans University, May 1935.
 Heritage and Hope: The African American Presence in United Methodism. Abingdon Press, 1991.
 Twentieth Century Negro Literature or, A Cyclopedia of Thought on the Vital Topics Relating to the American Negro, edited by Daniel Wallace Culp, published 1902, Project Gutenberg EBook #18772, July 2006 (available as Google eBook).
 Gilbert Academy and Agricultural College, Winsted, Louisiana, Sketches and Incidents, Selections from Journal, pp. 132–141 (Hunt & Eaton, 1893) (available as Google eBook).
 Lay Down Body: Living History in African American Cemeteries, pp. 124–125. Visible Ink Press, a division of Gale Research, Inc. (1996)

External links
 

1855 births
1933 deaths
African-American academics
African-American Methodist clergy
African-American people
Classics educators
American Methodist clergy
19th-century American slaves
Boston University School of Theology alumni
Dillard University alumni
Writers from New Orleans
Burials at South-View Cemetery
20th-century African-American people